SM UB-154' was a German Type UB III submarine or U-boat built for the German Imperial Navy during World War I. She was never commissioned into the German Imperial Navy but surrendered to France on 9 March 1919 in accordance with the requirements of the Armistice with Germany and broken up at Brest in July 1921.

Construction

SM UB-154 was built by AG Vulcan of Hamburg and following just under a year of construction, launched at Hamburg on 7 October 1918. UB-154 carried 10 torpedoes and was armed with an  deck gun. UB-154 had a displacement of  while surfaced and  when submerged. Her engines enabled her to travel at  when surfaced and  when submerged.

References

Notes

Citations

Bibliography 

 

German Type UB III submarines
World War I submarines of Germany
1918 ships
Ships built in Hamburg